The 2020–21 Saskatchewan Junior Hockey League was the league's 51st Season.

Final standings 
 x = Clinched playoff position
 y = Clinched division
 e = Eliminated from playoffs

Playoffs 
Playoffs cancelled during the first round due to Covid-19 Pandemic.

References 

Saskatchewan Junior Hockey League